The Arcanum Order is At the Throne of Judgment's first and only album, released on July 24, 2007 on Rise Records. It was recorded and produced by Joey Sturgis of The Foundation Studios in Connersville, Indiana. The lyrics deal with historical events that have happened in the past. Three of the songs on the album were re-recorded versions of songs on their debut demo.

Track listing
"Cacophonous" - 1:05
"Sentinel" - 3:27
"Mariner's Cutlass" - 3:48
"Horus Rises" - 3:57
"Discarnate by Design" - 4:15
"Four Winds" - 1:17
"Celestial Scourge" - 3:19
"Martyrdom; Ruin of Gaia" - 3:30
"Tomb of the Thracians" - 3:03
"Delphic Star" - 2:54
"The Captive" - 3:49
"Outro" - 1:39

Personnel
At the Throne of Judgement 
Eric Kemp - lead vocals 
Brad Weaver - guitars 
Adam McKibben - bass guitar 
James Ruehlmann - guitars
Roger Hensley - drums
Production
Produced by Joey Sturgis

References

2007 debut albums
Rise Records albums
Albums produced by Joey Sturgis
At the Throne of Judgment albums